Jack Hayward (23 August 1910 – 6 November 1976) was a Rhodesian cricketer. He played in eighteen first-class matches from 1927/28 to 1938/39.

References

External links
 

1910 births
1976 deaths
Border cricketers
Rhodesia cricketers
Sportspeople from Bulawayo